Mediusella is a genus of flowering plant belonging to the Sarcolaenaceae family, endemic to Madagascar.

Species
Two species are recognized:
 Mediusella arenaria 
 Mediusella bernieri

References

Sarcolaenaceae
Flora of Madagascar
Malvales genera